Reclaim Childhood is a Jordanian organisation that supports refugee girls. It was the Nansen Refugee Award finalist for the Middle East region in 2018.

Organization 
The organisation was founded by Anouk Dey and Katherine Krieg in the summer of 2008, initially focussing on helping Iraqi refugee girls. The headquarters are in Amman.

Reclaim Childhood operates in Amman and Zarqa and as of 2018, provided support to around 500 refugee and Jordanian girls aged between 8 and 18 years old. Services provided include after-school activities, including sports and dance classes. The girls who are refugees come from Syria, Palestine, Iraq, Sudan, Somalia, and Yemen. Reclaim Childhood employee refugees as staff.

Reclaim Childhood was the Nansen Refugee Award finalist for the Middle East region in 2018.

References

External links 
 Official website

Refugee aid organizations
2008 establishments in Jordan
Organizations established in 2008